The 1937 Illinois Fighting Illini football team was an American football team that represented the University of Illinois during the 1937 Big Ten Conference football season.  In their 25th season under head coach Robert Zuppke, the Illini compiled a 3–3–2 record and finished in eighth place in the Big Ten Conference. Quarterback Jack Berner was selected as the team's most valuable player.

Schedule

References

Illinois
Illinois Fighting Illini football seasons
Illinois Fighting Illini football